Jean-Pierre Droz (1746 - 1823) was a coin and medal engraver born in Switzerland and trained in Paris. Droz was most known for engraving the Napoléon coin at the Paris Mint. 

He was employed by the prominent English manufacturer and business man, Matthew Boulton (1728 - 1809) to improve Boulton's coin and medal quality. However, he worked there for just two years. In 1789, Droz devised a collar used to engrave the sides of coins and ensure a circular shape, and though it was unsuitable for large numbers of coins, it remained in use at the Soho Mint.

He was a member of the Royal Birmingham Society of Artists.

References

External links
 

1746 births
1823 deaths
Members and Associates of the Royal Birmingham Society of Artists
Coin designers